Gitega is one of the 18 provinces of Burundi. Its capital is Gitega, which is also the national capital.

History
After Burundi attained full independence on 1 July 1962, there was a military coup d'état in which the king was overthrown and monarchy disbanded in 1966. When King Ntare V tried to reinstate his kingdom, he was assassinated in 1972 at the Royal Palace of Gitega.

On 26 April 1996, army attacks at Buhoro killed some 230 civilians. On 21 October, some 70 Tutsi students were burnt alive at Kibimba. In March 2007, President Pierre Nkurunziza announced that Burundi had plans to transfer the capital from Bujumbura to Gitega. According to him, the central location of the city makes it "an ideal place to better serve the majority of the population". The capital was moved on 24 December 2018.

Geography
Gitega Province is located in central Burundi. Gitega is a central highland province along with Kayanza and Muramvya.

Communes
Gitega Province is divided administratively into 11 communes:

 Commune of Bugendana
 Commune of Bukirasazi
 Commune of Buraza
 Commune of Giheta
 Commune of Gishubi
 Commune of Gitega
 Commune of Itaba
 Commune of Makebuko
 Commune of Mutaho
 Commune of Nyanrusange
 Commune of Ryansoro

Demographics
Gitega Province is one of the seventeen provinces of Burundi and Gitega is its capital city. The province has a population of 725,223 and the Gitega Commune the largest population of 155,005; the least populous commune is Ryansoro with a population of 35,835. Gitega city had a population of 20,700 in 1990. As of June 2000, 21,350 people were located in internally displaced persons (IDP) camps, housed in 16 settlements within the province.

Climate

Economy
Burundi is diversifying from the main economic activities of agriculture and livestock farming. One such micro project is in the fisheries sector in Gitega. In 1999, the Dushirehamwe fish farm association was established in the province with 23 men and women. In 2002, they received a grant from Africare. After the success of the first fish farm under the grant, the association successfully launched a second project with its own funds in 2003. Africare has also supported measures to strengthen civil society organizations. While the principal hospital in the province is Gitega Hospital in Gitega City, the only state-run rehabilitation center for landmine victims is located in the province.

Religion

Mushasha is the seat of the Catholic archbishop. The Archdiocese of Gitega, the Metropolitan See for the Ecclesiastical province of Gitega, was established in 1959. Approximately 77 percent out of the total population in the province belongs to the diocese.

Landmarks
Some of the landmarks in the province are the national museum and drum sanctuaries. Burundi National Museum was established in 1955. It consists of two distinct areas, the traditional museum building and the drummers' sanctuary. Exhibits consist of drums, dance and musical instruments, baskets, calabashes weaponry, and tools used in sorcery. It also houses ancient Burundian dresses and a large library.

The royal palace is located on a hill top 45 miles away from Gitega; it contains a traditional art museum. It is located within the military camp where the King Ntare V was incarcerated. The drum sanctuary is in the precincts of the royal palace. It houses ancient drums and drum making tools, and offers exhibitions with dance and music programmes for the public. The sanctuary's objective is to preserve and popularize the Burundian culture particularly the role of the drum in its history. Of the two personal drums of the king, one is in the sanctuary and the other is preserved in the museum. Dancers performed with these drums for the king. This sanctuary was refurbished in 1988. The rukinzo drum used to be part of the king's entourage.

Also in the province are a craftwares village and the Gitega Art School of ceramics, paintings and sculptures. There is also an artistic centre where ceramics, leather and wood carvings are made. The Chutes de la Kalera, close to Rutana, is a natural scenic attraction during the rainy season.

References

Bibliography

 
Provinces of Burundi